is a professional Japanese baseball player. He plays infielder for the Hokkaido Nippon-Ham Fighters.

References 

2000 births
Living people
Baseball players from Michigan
Japanese baseball players
Nippon Professional Baseball infielders
Hokkaido Nippon-Ham Fighters  players